Thomas Price may refer to:

Thomas Price (South Australian politician) (1852–1909), Premier of South Australia
Thomas Price (bishop) (1599–1685), Church of Ireland archbishop of Cashel
Thomas Price (Carnhuanawc) (1787–1848), Welsh literary figure of the early 19th century
Thomas Price (Queensland politician) (1840–1906), Member of the Queensland Legislative Assembly, Australia
Thomas Price (soldier) (1842–1911), Australian soldier
Thomas Frederick Price (1860–1919), co-founder of the Catholic Foreign Mission Society of America, better known as the Maryknoll Fathers and Brothers
Thomas J. Price (born 1980 ) British sculptor
Thomas Lawson Price (1809–1870), U.S. Representative from Missouri
Thomas M. Price (1916–1998), American architect
Thomas Rowe Price Jr. (1898–1983), American investor and developer of the growth stock style of investing
Thomas Phillips Price (1844–1932), Welsh landowner, mine owner and Liberal politician
Thomas Price (Baptist minister) (1820–1888), Welsh Baptist minister
Thommy Price (born 1956), American rock musician
Tommy Price (1911–1998), speedway rider
Tommy Price (born 1907) (1907–?), speedway rider
Tomos Prys (c. 1564–1634), also Thomas Price, Welsh soldier, sailor and poet
Thomas Price (governor), President of the British Virgin Islands
Thomas Price (actor) (born 1985), Hong Kong-born actor
Thomas Slater Price (1875–1949), British chemist
Thomas Price (architect) (fl. 1846-1850), architect of Walkerville Brewery and other buildings in Adelaide, South Australia

See also
Tom Price (disambiguation)
Thomas Pryce (disambiguation)